T.Palm– was a UCI Continental team founded in 2006 and based in Belgium. It participated in UCI Continental Circuits races.

Team roster

Major wins
2009
Prologue Tour of Wellington, Ryan Wills
Stage 10 Tour du Faso, Jeremy Burton
Stage 9 Tour of Southland, Romain Fondard
2010
Stages 3 Tour du Faso, Jeremy Burton
Stage 7 Tour du Faso, Christophe Prémont
2012
Grand Prix Criquielion, Tom David

References

UCI Continental Teams (Europe)
Cycling teams based in Belgium
Cycling teams established in 2006